James Low (9 March 1894 – 5 March 1960) was a Scottish footballer who played as an outside right (winger).

Early life
Low was born in Ayrshire and raised in Elgin.

Early playing career
He began his career at local club Elgin City where he garnered the nicknames, 'Jamie' or 'Jimmy', then moved south to study agriculture at the University of Edinburgh, where he was playing for their football team when scouted by Heart of Midlothian.

Low broke into the strong Hearts first team as a teenager and also represented the Scottish League twice in 1914.

First world war service
In November 1914 he was one of the contingent from the club who enlisted to fight in World War I in McCrae's Battalion. Due to his university education he was coveted by specialist units, and became a 2nd Lieutenant in the 6th Battalion of the Seaforth Highlanders. In 1917 he was wounded in action, sustaining a head injury. At the end of the war he returned to Hearts.

Later playing career
Low in total played in a dozen matches, until his war injury affected his play and he was released on a free transfer.

Low returned home to play for Elgin City, however his condition improved and in March 1920 he was signed by Rangers following a successful trial. He was backup to the established Sandy Archibald at Ibrox Park and featured in only a handful of matches before transferring to Newcastle United in October 1921.

Low remained at Newcastle for seven years and played regularly, making 123 league and cup appearances. He was an FA Cup winner with the Magpies in 1924.

After retiring in 1930 he returned to Elgin to run his family business manufacturing fishing nets. He died in 1960, days before his 66th birthday.

References 

Scottish footballers
1894 births
1960 deaths
Military personnel from East Ayrshire
People from Elgin, Moray
People from Kilbirnie
Alumni of the University of Edinburgh
Association football wingers
Elgin City F.C. players
Highland Football League players
Heart of Midlothian F.C. players
Rangers F.C. players
Scottish Football League players
Scottish Football League representative players
English Football League players
Newcastle United F.C. players
McCrae's Battalion
Seaforth Highlanders officers
British Army personnel of World War I
Sportspeople from Moray
FA Cup Final players